Lettie D. Campbell was an American politician from Afton, Wyoming who served a single term in the Wyoming House of Representatives. She was elected in 1930, and represented Lincoln County from 1931 to 1933 as a Republican in the 21st Wyoming Legislature. Campbell represented Lincoln County alongside R. H. Embree, A. E. Wilde, and Platt Wilson.

Notes

References

External links
Official page at the Wyoming Legislature

Year of birth missing
Year of death missing
20th-century American women politicians
Democratic Party members of the Wyoming House of Representatives
Women state legislators in Wyoming
People from Afton, Wyoming